Deep Bay is a rural locality in the local government area (LGA) of Huon Valley in the South-east LGA region of Tasmania. The 2016 census recorded a population of 231 for the state suburb of Deep Bay.

History 
Deep Bay is a confirmed locality.

Geography
Much of the western boundary follows the shoreline of Port Cygnet.

Road infrastructure 
Route B68 (Channel Highway) runs through from north-west to south.

References

Towns in Tasmania
Localities of Huon Valley Council